Cockerham Priory was a priory served by Austin Canons in Cockerham, Lancashire, England. St Michael's Church was granted to Leicester Abbey c. 1153–54, with some land. The priory was founded in 1207 or 1208 as a cell of the Abbey of St Mary de Pratis ("St Mary in the Meadows") in Leicester.

References

Footnotes

Sources

Monasteries in Lancashire
Buildings and structures in the City of Lancaster
Augustinian monasteries in England
1207 establishments in England
Christian monasteries established in the 13th century